Qinghuayuan may refer to:

 Tsinghua University
 Qinghuayuan railway station